The Wah Wah Springs Caldera is a supervolcanic eruption remnant discovered in 2013 in Utah. It released  of tephra, as the Wah Wah Springs Tuff, about 30.06 million years ago in the early Oligocene. It is the largest of the Indian Peak-Caliente Caldera Complex, and includes flows over 500 m (1,640 feet) thick at the most. It is considered one of the largest single explosive eruptions known in Earth's history, and the second most energetic event to have occurred on Earth since the asteroid impact at the end of the Cretaceous period.

See also
List of largest volcanic eruptions

References

External links
 by Science Time
 by Brigham Young University
 by The Real MLordandGod

Volcanoes of Utah
Extinct volcanoes
Geology of the Rocky Mountains
Calderas of Utah
Supervolcanoes
Oligocene calderas
VEI-8 volcanoes
Arikareean